Kutorginates are early rhynchonelliform brachiopods.

Their annulated pedicles emerge from the apex of their pedicle valve, but they also have a large opening between the valves (from which the pedicle has, at various times, been alleged to emerge from).

The pedicles are much larger than the apical opening.

Included genera

Kutorgina
Kutorgina has a concavo-convex shell with the smaller brachial valve dished in and the larger pedicle valve broadly arched. The brachial valve has a rather prominent interarea at the back which is curved over by the prominent beak at the back of the pedicle valve.

It includes the species Kutorgina elanica Malakhovskaya, 2013 and K. chengjiangensis Zhang et al. 2007.

K. chengjiangensis preserves soft anatomy - pedicle, lophophore & gut.

Nisusia
Nisusia  Walcott, 1905 (Walcott, 1889) is known from the Middle Cambrian (~) Burgess Shale. 133 specimens of Kutorginata are known from the Greater Phyllopod bed, where they comprise 0.25% of the community.

It's a senior synonym to Orthisina alberta Walcott, 1889.

ITS pedicle emerges from between its valves, as displayed by silicified material of N. sulcate, though it still has an opening at the apex of the pedicle valve.

References

Kutorginata
 Moore, Lalicker, and Fischer. Invertebrate Fossils, ch 6 Brachiopoda. McGraw-Hill 1952.

External links 
 

Burgess Shale fossils
Prehistoric brachiopod genera
Paleontology in Washington (state)
Burgess Shale animals

Cambrian genus extinctions